Shailendra Kumar Yadav is a Nepalese politician who is elected member of Provincial Assembly of Madhesh Province from People's Socialist Party, Nepal. Yadav, a resident of Shahidnagar, Dhanusha was elected to the 2017 provincial assembly election from Dhanusha 2(A).

Electoral history

2017 Nepalese provincial elections

References

External links

Living people
1968 births
Members of the Provincial Assembly of Madhesh Province
Madhesi people
People from Dhanusha District
People's Socialist Party, Nepal politicians